The Gordon House is a residence designed by influential architect Frank Lloyd Wright, now located within the Oregon Garden, in Silverton, Oregon.  It is an example of Wright's Usonian vision for America.
It is one of the last of the Usonian series that Wright designed as affordable housing for American working class consumers, which—in 1939—were considered to have an annual income of $5,000–6,000 ($95,000 to $113,000 in 2021 dollars).  The house is based on a design for a modern home commissioned by Life magazine in 1938.

History
The house was designed in 1957 for Evelyn and Conrad Gordon, and finished in 1963 (four years after Frank Lloyd Wright's death). It was originally located near Wilsonville, Oregon, situated to take advantage of views of the adjacent Willamette River on the west side and Mount Hood to the east. After Evelyn Gordon's death in 1997, the house was sold to new owners David and Carey Smith, who wanted to tear it down to make room for a larger, more contemporary structure. The Frank Lloyd Wright Building Conservancy became involved in attempts to preserve the historic house. The "Building Conservancy" is an organization devoted to advocating for Wright buildings, and finding sites for buildings that have been put on the market. In early 2001, the Building Conservancy obtained a three-month reprieve to dismantle the Gordon House, and move it to the Oregon Garden, about 21 miles (34 km) southeast of its original location.  The Conservancy accepted a proposal from the Oregon Garden Society, assisted by the City of Silverton, to take charge of moving and reinstalling the house. Dismantling began on March 9, 2001.  The house was moved in four large pieces, with the upper floor, containing two bedrooms and one bath, moved as a single unit.  Overall neglect required refurbishing of the structure's siding and roofing which was arranged by grants from the Architecture Foundation of Oregon and the Oregon Cultural Trust.  A new foundation replicating the original was constructed.
The house opened one year later as the only publicly accessible Frank Lloyd Wright home in the Pacific Northwest.

Description

With  of floor space, the house boasts  floor-to-ceiling windows and glass French doors in the living room and Wright's classic horizontal designs and features connecting interior and exterior space.  The second story features two bedrooms, each with its own private balcony. Designed based on a seven-foot square grid, the house is visually anchored to a single mass of windowless concrete block forming the walls of the small basement and kitchen and extending beyond the roofline, obscuring various vents and the large skylight to the kitchen ("workspace") below. The house is constructed of cedar and painted cinder block and continues Wright's tradition of custom patterned wood cutout window lattice known as fretwork.

The Gordon House was listed on the National Register of Historic Places on September 22, 2004.  It is cared for by the Gordon House Conservancy and available for small catered gatherings.  When not reserved, the house is available for public tours as a historic house museum.

Gallery

See also 
Frank Lloyd Wright Building Conservancy
List of Frank Lloyd Wright works
 List of Registered Historic Places in Marion County, Oregon

References 

 Storrer, William Allin. The Frank Lloyd Wright Companion. University Of Chicago Press, 2006,  (S.419)

External links 
 Gordon House Conservancy

Frank Lloyd Wright buildings
Houses in Marion County, Oregon
Historic house museums in Oregon
Museums in Marion County, Oregon
Silverton, Oregon
Houses completed in 1963
Houses on the National Register of Historic Places in Oregon
National Register of Historic Places in Marion County, Oregon
Relocated buildings and structures in Oregon
Relocated houses
Modernist architecture in Oregon
1963 establishments in Oregon